Colletes inaequalis is a common species of plasterer bee (family Colletidae), native to North America. Like other species in the genus, it builds cells in underground nests that are lined with a polyester secretion, earning the genus the nickname of polyester bees. C. inaequalis is a pollinator of red maple trees, willow trees, and apple trees.

References

External links

Colletidae
Hymenoptera of North America
Insects of the United States
Insects described in 1837